Bluewater Health is a hospital in Sarnia, Ontario. It was opened October 3, 1896 as Sarnia General Hospital and was the community's first public hospital. In 2010, with extensive renovations to the two existing buildings and construction of a third, it was renamed Bluewater Health. It employs almost 1,800 staff and physicians, along with over 700 volunteers, and is Sarnia—Lambton's largest public sector employer. It is funded primarily by the Ministry of Health and Long-Term Care, with additional fundraising by Bluewater Health Foundation and Charlotte Eleanor Englehart Hospital foundation. It has 326 beds, 8 operating rooms, an emergency department, and a full spectrum of programs to serve the approximately 125,000 people in the Sarnia-Lambton area.

History
There were several doctors in the Sarnia community in 1880, but because there was no hospital in the area, serious medical help had to be sought in London,  to the east.  On July 7, 1890, a public meeting was held to canvas for subscriptions for a hospital. By 1895, $13,000 had been raised.  A three-story hospital with 26 beds was opened on October 3, 1896, at a cost of about $25,000.

The hospital was operated by a trust until 1920 when it was given to the city and became a municipally-operated hospital.  Stress on the hospital became severe with an admission of about 800 patients a year.  In 1929, about 80 beds were added, which met the needs of the community until 1952.  In January 1953, the hospital doors were closed while construction of a new five-story building took place.  The new hospital opened in March 1954 at a cost of about $2.7 million, and had enough beds for 266 adults and 50 newborns.

By November 1963, expansion of the facility led to a capacity of 315 beds at a cost of about $1.5 million.

Programs and services

 Ambulatory care
 Bone density
 Cancer care
 Cardiology
 Communication disorders
 CT scan
 Diagnostic imaging
 Dialysis
 Emergency services
 Intensive care
 Mammography
 Mental health & addiction
 MRI
 Occupational therapy
 Palliative care
 Physiotherapy
 Surgery
 X-ray

Statistics
Babies born: 969
Number of beds: 326
Dialysis treatments: 8,453
Emergency room visits: 83,690
Hospitalizations: 12,025
Laboratory procedures: 2,719,894
MRIs: 7,943
Surgeries: 10,680

Community engagement
Bluewater Health has two advisory panels composed of residents of the surrounding community, including students from local secondary and post-secondary schools.  The panels meet four times yearly to gather and share input into hospital planning and decision-making. The CEO attends the meetings along with a representative of the board of directors.

The hospital welcomes presentations from diverse cultural perspectives. It has met with representatives from the local Muslim association regarding Islamic customs, dietary concerns, etc.; and with a local Aboriginal patient representative with regards to cultural implications for healthcare.

Awards and recognition
Accreditation Canada awarded Bluewater Health the distinction of "Accreditation with Exemplary Standing" for 2015–2019, with a score of 99.3%.  In 2012, it became the first acute care hospital in Ontario to achieve LEED certification (Leadership in Energy and Environmental Design).  In 2016, Bluewater Health achieved a 97% patient satisfaction rate.

Other awards:

 Bridging Excellence Award (2015)
 Ontario's Best Practice Spotlight Organization (2015)
 Bill Wilson Patient Safety Award (2014)
 Quality Healthcare Workplace Award (2011, 2012, 2013, 2014)
 Ontario Accessibility Award (2012)
 Outstanding Business Achievement (2011)

Notes

References

External links
 Bluewater Health
 Bluewater Health Foundation
 Patient & Family Guide

Hospitals in Ontario
Public–private partnership projects in Canada
Buildings and structures in Sarnia